Ursula, the Girl from the Finnish Forests (Swedish: Ursula - Flickan i Finnskogarna) is a 1953 Swedish drama film directed by Ivar Johansson and starring Eva Stiberg, Birger Malmsten and Naima Wifstrand. It was shot at the Centrumateljéerna Studios in Stockholm and on location in Värmland County. The film's sets were designed by the art director Bibi Lindström. It was one of several films the director made featuring the Forest Finns.

Synopsis
Ursula is the daughter of a farmer, but she is faced with the dilemma of continuing with her studies of taking over her father's farm.

Cast

 Eva Stiberg as 	Ursula Cecilia Persson
 Birger Malmsten as 	Hans Halvarsson
 Naima Wifstrand as Mossi
 Olof Bergström as 	Erik von Holk
 Dagmar Ebbesen as 	Kersti
 Artur Rolén as 	Jöns Virtta
 Åke Fridell as 	Kåre Flatten
 Sten Lindgren as 	Karl Persson
 Arne Källerud as 	Torsén
 Olof Sandborg as Judge
 Peter Lindgren as 	Arne
 Arne Lindblad as 	Haikko
 Carl-Olof Alm as 	Bengt
 Lissi Alandh as 	Gerslög
 Arthur Fischer as Karlsson
 Harald Emanuelsson as 	Göran 'Manne' Stangen
 Wilma Malmlöf as 	Mrs. Svensson
 Alf Östlund as 	Svensson, court janitor
 Nils Hultgren as 	Bengt Halvarsson
 Helga Brofeldt as 	Tilda, Haikko's wife 
 Björn Berglund as 	Chairman
 Gustaf Färingborg as 	Erik Jansson 
 Gunlög Hagberg as 	Jenny, Ursula's friend
 Ivar Hallbäck as 	Lindstedt, vicar 
 Svea Holst as Fina
 Eric Laurent as 	Karl Jönsson
 Birger Lensander as Vestlund 
 Karin Miller as 	Hulda, maid 
 Emy Storm as 	Marit

References

Bibliography 
 Qvist, Per Olov & von Bagh, Peter. Guide to the Cinema of Sweden and Finland. Greenwood Publishing Group, 2000.

External links 
 

1953 films
Swedish drama films
1953 drama films
1950s Swedish-language films
Films directed by Ivar Johansson
Swedish black-and-white films
Films based on Swedish novels
1950s Swedish films